Goran Barjaktarević (born 25 May 1969) is a Bosnian football manager and former player.

Playing career
Barjaktarević was born in Zenica, Yugoslavia and played youth football at NK Čelik Zenica. He went on to play for FC Koper and Belgrade-based clubs Red Star and FK Obilić.

With Yugoslavia in civil war, he moved to Icelandic second tier side ÍF Leiftur.

He played for Moroccan side FUS Rabat during the 1992–93 season.

Managerial career
Barjaktarević was appointed manager of Goslarer SC 08 in 2007. He helped the club to two successive promotions, from the Bezirksoberliga to the Regionalliga Nord. He was dismissed in January 2010 with the club placed last.

From 2011 to 2013 he coached the U19 team of Eintracht Braunschweig.

On 5 January 2018 he left German amateur club I.G. Bönen to become manager of Thai League 1 side Chonburi.

Barjaktarević was appointed manager of Ghanaian side Wa All Stars FC in December 2019, ahead of the 2019–20 Ghana Premier League. His stint with the club, renamed to Legon Cities, ended in November with 2020 just two matches of the 2020–21 season played.

References

External links
 German career stats - FuPa

1969 births
Living people
Sportspeople from Zenica
Bosnia and Herzegovina footballers
Association football midfielders
FC Koper players
Red Star Belgrade footballers
FK Obilić players
Goran Barjaktarević
Fath Union Sport players
SV Wilhelmshaven players
Atlas Delmenhorst players
Regionalliga players
Bosnia and Herzegovina football managers
Goran Barjaktarevic
Bosnia and Herzegovina expatriate footballers
Bosnia and Herzegovina expatriate sportspeople in Iceland
Expatriate footballers in Iceland
Bosnia and Herzegovina expatriate sportspeople in Morocco
Expatriate footballers in Morocco
Bosnia and Herzegovina expatriate sportspeople in Germany
Expatriate footballers in Germany
Expatriate football managers in Germany
Bosnia and Herzegovina expatriate sportspeople in Thailand
Expatriate football managers in Thailand
Expatriate football managers in Ghana
Bosnia and Herzegovina expatriate sportspeople in Ghana
Bosnia and Herzegovina expatriate football managers